Martin Sperr (14 September 1944  – 6 April 2002) was a German dramatist and actor. He was born in Steinberg near Marklkofen and died in Landshut.

Awards and honors
1978 Mülheimer Dramatikerpreis

Works
 1965 Jagdszenen aus Niederbayern
 1967 Landshuter Erzählungen
 1970 Koralle Meier
 1970 Herr Bertolt Brecht sagt. Bei Brecht gelesen und für Kinder und andere Leute ausgesucht (with Monika Sperr)
 1971 Münchner Freiheit
 1971 Die Kunst der Zähmung (adapted from William Shakespeare's The Taming of the Shrew)
 1977 Die Spitzeder
 1979 Willst du Giraffen ohrfeigen, mußt du ihr Niveau haben (poems and drawings)

Filmography 
 1969: Hunting Scenes from Bavaria (dir. Peter Fleischmann)
 1970: Mathias Kneissl (dir. Reinhard Hauff)
 1972:  (dir. Peer Raben)
 1981–1983: Die Knapp-Familie (TV series)

References
 

1944 births
2002 deaths
People from Dingolfing-Landau
German male stage actors
German male dramatists and playwrights
20th-century German dramatists and playwrights
20th-century German male writers